Clotilde ( 474–548), also known as Clothilde, Clotilda, Clotild, Rotilde etc. (Latin: Chrodechildis, Chlodechildis from Frankish *Hrōþihildi or perhaps *Hlōdihildi, both "famous in battle"), was a Queen of All the Franks. She was supposedly descended from the Gothic king Athanaric and became the second wife of the Frankish king Clovis I in 493. The Merovingian dynasty to which her husband belonged ruled Frankish kingdoms for over 200 years (450–758).

Venerated as a saint by the Roman Catholic Church as well as by the Eastern Orthodox Church, she played a role in her husband's famous conversion to Christianity and, in her later years, became known for her almsgiving and penitential works of mercy. She is credited with spreading Christianity within western Europe.

Biography

Clotilde was born at the Burgundian court of Lyon, the daughter of King Chilperic II of Burgundy. Upon the death of Chilperic's father King Gondioc in 473, Chilperic and his brothers Gundobad and Godegisel divided their inheritance; Chilperic II apparently reigning at Lyon, Gundobad at Vienne, and Godegesil at Geneva.

From the sixth century on, the marriage of Clovis and Clotilde was made the theme of epic narratives, in which the original facts were materially altered and the various versions found their way into the works of different Frankish chroniclers. According to Gregory of Tours (538–594), in 493 Chilperic II was slain by his brother Gundobad  and his wife Caretene was drowned with a stone hung around her neck, while of his two daughters, Chrona took the veil and Clotilde was exiled – it is, however, assumed that this tale is apocryphal. Butler's account follows Gregory.

After the death of Chilperic, her mother seems to have made her home with Godegisil at Geneva, where her other daughter, Chrona, founded the church of Saint-Victor. Soon after the death of Chilperic in 493, Clovis asked and obtained the hand of Clotilde. They were married in 493.

The marriage produced the following children:

 Ingomer (born and died 494).
 Chlodomer (495–524), King of the Franks at Orléans from 511.
 Childebert I (496–558), King of the Franks at Paris from 511.
 Chlothar I (497–561), King of the Franks at Soissons from 511, King of all Franks from 558.
 Clotilde (500–531), married Amalaric, King of the Visigoths.

Clotilde was brought up as a Christian and did not rest until her husband had abjured paganism and embraced Christianity.  According to Gregory of Tours' Historia Francorum (History of the Franks), when Clotilde had their first child baptised, he died soon after. Clovis upbraided her; but when Chlodomer was born, she insisted on baptising him also. Although Chlodomer did indeed fall ill, he soon after recovered. More healthy children followed.

Clotilde's victory came in 496, when Clovis converted to Christianity, baptised by Bishop Remigius of Reims on Christmas Day of that year.  According to tradition, on the eve of the Battle of Tolbiac against the Alamanni, Clovis prayed to God, swearing to be baptised if he emerged victorious on the battlefield. When he did indeed triumph, Clovis readily took the faith. With him Clotilde built at Paris the Church of the Holy Apostles, afterwards known as the Abbey of St Genevieve.

Significance
Unusually, Clotilde was a Catholic Christian at a time when Goths, including the Burgundians, were Arian Christians. Therefore Clovis became a Catholic. This ensured that he had the support of the Eastern Roman Empire in his wars against his rival Arian Gothic tribes, since the Romans were Catholics. When the Franks eventually gained dominance over Western Europe, it was Catholicism which became the prevalent kind of Christianity, and Arianism died out.

Later years

After Clovis' death in 511, Clotilde retired to the Abbey of St. Martin at Tours.

In 523 Clotilde's sons went to war against her cousin King Sigismund of Burgundy, the son of Gundobad, which led to Sigismund's deposition and imprisonment. Sigismund was assassinated the following year and his body thrown down a well in symbolic retaliation for the deaths of Clotilde's parents. Gregory of Tours claimed – and many others have followed – that Clotilde incited her sons to war as a means to revenge the supposed murder of her parents by Gundobad while others, such as Godefroid Kurth, find this unconvincing and apocryphal. Subsequently, her eldest son Chlodomer was killed during the following Burgundian campaign under Sigismund's successor King Godomar at the Battle of Vézeronce. Her daughter, also named Clotilde, also died about this time. Clotilde tried in vain to protect the rights of her three grandsons, the children of Chlodomer, against the claims of her surviving sons Childebert and Chlothar. Chlothar had two of them killed, while only Clodoald (Cloud) managed to escape and later chose an ecclesiastical career. She was equally unsuccessful in her efforts to prevent the civil discords between her children.

After these failures, Clotilde appeared to dedicate herself to a saintly life. She occupied herself with the building of churches and monasteries, preferring to distance herself from the power struggles of the court. Churches associated with her are located at Laon and Rouen.

On 3 June 548, Clotilde died at the tomb of St. Martin of Tours, of natural causes. Her body was transported by her sons Chlothar and Childebert  in a funeral procession to the Basilica of the Holy Apostles (now the Abbey of St Genevieve), and buried alongside her husband, Clovis I.

Veneration
Clotilde's veneration made her the patron of queens, widows, brides and those in exile. In Normandy especially she was venerated as the patroness of the lame, those who came to a violent death and women who suffered from ill-tempered husbands. In art she is often depicted presiding over the baptism of Clovis, or as a suppliant at the shrine of Saint Martin. Several fine images of her remain, particularly in the 16th-century stained glass window at Andelys. Her relics survived the French Revolution, and are housed in the Église Saint-Leu-Saint-Gilles in Paris.

Clotilde is the patron saint of Les Andelys, Normandy. In 511, the Queen founded a convent for young girls of the nobility there, which was destroyed by the Normans in 911. In its place was erected Our Lady's Collegiate Church, which contains a statue of Saint Clotilde. Also in Les Andelys is Saint Clotilde's Fountain. The spring is popularly believed to heal skin diseases.

See also

 List of Catholic saints
 List of Frankish queens

References

474 births
545 deaths
Burgundian women
Frankish queens consort
History of Burgundy
Merovingian dynasty
Christian royal saints
Princesses
Christian female saints of the Middle Ages
5th-century women
6th-century women
6th-century Frankish saints
Queen mothers